Miss the Mississippi is the seventh studio album by American country music singer Crystal Gayle. Released in September 1979, it peaked at #3 on the Billboard Country Albums chart.

The album was her first album for Columbia Records, and contained three Country top ten hits; "Half the Way" (#2), "It's Like We Never Said Goodbye" (#1) and "The Blue Side" (#8). "Half the Way" also reached #15 on the Billboard Hot 100 pop chart.

The album was certified gold by the RIAA in 1980.

Track listing

Personnel
Gene Chrisman, Kenny Malone (tracks: A4, A5) – drums, percussion
Joe Allan (track: B2), Joe Osborn (tracks A3 to A5), Spady Brannan (tracks A1, A2, B1, B3, B4), Bob Moore (track B5) – bass guitar
Charles Cochran, Hargus "Pig" Robbins, Bobby Wood – keyboards
Chris Leuzinger, Jerry McEwen, Billy Sanford, Rod Smarr, Barry "Byrd" Burton – guitars
Lloyd Green – dobro on (track B5)
Billy Puett, Denis Solee – saxophone
Roger Bissell, Dennis Good, Rex Peer, Terry Williams – trombone
Terry McMillan – harmonica (track: B3)
Crystal Gayle - backing vocals (tracks A2 to A4, B4)
Crystal Gayle, Garth Fundis, Allen Reynolds - backing vocals (track B1)
Allen Reynolds, Crystal Gayle, Garth Fundis, Frank Saulino, Jennifer Kimball, Jim Valenti, Spady Brannan - backing vocals (track A1)
Vickie Carrico, Pebble Daniel, Allen Reynolds, Marcia Routh, Crystal Gayle – backing vocals (track A5)
Pebble Daniel, Marcia Routh, Crystal Gayle, Vickie Carrico - backing vocals (track B4)
Cover photographs by Francesco Scavullo

Production
Produced by Allen Reynolds
Recorded and engineered by Garth Fundis

References

External links

Crystal Gayle albums
1979 albums
Albums produced by Allen Reynolds
Columbia Records albums